Sunil Ganguly (1 January 1938 – 12 June 1999) was an Indian instrumentalist from the city of Calcutta. He played and popularized the Hawaiian electric guitar in India. He created many albums from HMV India, now Saregama India, Concorde Records, Sagarika, during his long career (1957—1999) with his instrumental renditions of Indian Hindi film songs, Classical based songs, ghazals of prominent composers like Mehdi Hassan, Ghulam Ali, Jagjit Singh, Bade Ghulam Ali, Bengali film songs and modern songs, Nazrulgeeti, Rabindrasangeet (Songs of Tagore).

Sunil Ganguly gave many public performances all over India, including Calcutta, Bombay, Delhi, Lucknow, Patna, Guwahati, Agartala etc. He did one-man whole night shows in Mumbai, played in College fests like the IITs, Regional Engineering Colleges. He had a big group of musicians accompanying him on his performances, like Sri Y S Mulki, Sri Dilip Roy, Sri Samir Khasnabis, Sri Swapan Sen, Sri Manohari Singh accompanied him on his recordings and performances. He was a regular performer at Doordarshan programs (TV) in Calcutta and Bombay, AIR (All India Radio), Radio Ceylon.

Early life and career 
Ganguly was born at Sonamura village in Tripura on 1 January 1938. He moved with his parents to Calcutta in his childhood.

He participated and won the All India Youth Guitar competition. Ustad Bade Ghulam Ali Khan then recommended Sunil Ganguly's name to All India Radio / Akashvani with a letter, and this is how Sunil Ganguly started playing on radio.

He trained in Western music under Oscar Jones, a teacher in Calcutta.

He later trained under the sitarist Pt. Ajoy Sinha Roy, who himself was a direct disciple of Baba Alauddin Khan. Ganguly, therefore, had a profound knowledge of North Indian Classical music. He was the first to bring in the 'gayaki' style of playing which was non-existent at the time, and this led to the huge popularity of the instrumentals he rendered on the Hawaiian guitar, be it classical based film songs, ghazals, Tagore songs, Nazrul songs, or other popular songs. He played a wide variety of songs in his career, including Hindi film songs, rare songs of Lata Mangeshkar, Ghazals, by Jagjit Singh, Mehdi Hassan, Ghulam Ali, Bengali film songs, Tagore songs, Nazrulgeeti, Bengali songs of composers like Satinath Mukhopadhyay, Shyamal Mitra, Hemanta Mukherjee, Bihu songs in Assamese language.

His recording career spanned more than 40 years from 1957, when he cut his first album from HMV. The Bengali singer and composer, Sri Satinath Mukhopadhyay played a major role in introducing Sunil Ganguly to HMV. Some of his records include 'Ghazal chedi usne' - an album of instrumentals of ghazals by prominent singers such as Mehdi Hassan, Jagjit Singh, Ghulam Ali,'Ibteda' - an album of compositions by Jagjit Singh,'The Classic Touch','Sentimental Journey','The Golden Collection - All Time Greats, Vol I and II','Swinging hits','More hits','Magic Melody','Instrumental Film Hits','Sunil Ganguly (the name of the album used to be his name)','The Singing Guitar' - with Kazi Aniruddha, 'Encore - Electric Guitar','Renaissance - Tunes of Kazi Nazrul Islam on the guitar (the first album he did on Kazi Nazrul Islam songs)' , 'Khelicho E Biswa Loye - Nazrulgeeti tunes', 'Surer Jharna - instrumental of Bengali hits', 'Tribute to Hemanta Mukherjee - Hemanta Mukherjee songs'  etc.

Towards the later part of his career, Sunil Ganguly made a few  albums from Concorde records and Sagarika Co. (For ex: 'Ei Sundor Swarnali Sondhay - Bengali hits like 'Jibon Khatar prati patay', 'Bhora thak Smritisudhay -Tagore songs' from Sagarika, 'Instrumental Film Hits - containing hits from Betaab, Agar Tum na Hote' from Concord. HMV and other Cos, released some of his best instrumentals in the form of CD, for ex: 'Nostalgia : Ghazal Chedi Usne, Great Ghazals on guitar', 'Nostalgia : Melodies to caress your Heart 'N' Soul', 'Tumi Rabe Nirobe', 'Instrumentally Yours - Tribute to Manna Dey', 'The Best of Bollywood Instrumentals Ever' from HMV (now Saregama Ltd), 'Yaadein' (containing hits of Kishore Kumar and Md. Rafi), 'Golden greats from Yesteryears' from Sagarika.

Personal life 
Ganguly's son, Kaushik Ganguly, became a prominent film director.

Ganguly was active in giving music classes at his residence, and in doing recordings, until the last day. He took music classes at several institutions in Calcutta like BaniChakra (South Calcutta), Technique Studio (North Calcutta), in addition to the ones at his residence in Garia. Students used to come from far away places to his residence classes, including places like Asansol, Durgapur, Odisha, Tripura.

He was an ardent follower of Swami Vivekananda till his last day. Sunil Ganguly had many disciples, many of whom took the guitar as a profession. The music classes based on his way of teaching are kept going by the creation of Sunil Ganguly Academy of Music, at his residence, run by Sri Aloke Ghosh, one of his disciples. Apart from this many of his students like Smt Sonali Nath, Smt Geeta Deb, Sri Shyamal Chowdhury, Sri Amarnath Banik at Agartala, Tripura are continuing to play and teach his style of music to this date.

Discography

 His Concord Records Label include
 Instrumental Film Hits LP (1984) 04 0001
 Renaissance (Tunes from Najrulgeeti) LP (1984) 04 0001

 Cassettes from HMV (RPG Enterprises)
 Ibteda Ever melodious compositions of Jagjit Singh on Electric Hawaaian Guitar (1993) SPHOS 23211
 The Golden Collection – All Time Greats – Sunil Ganguly Vols 1 and 2 (1994) STHV 842607 and 842608
 Khelicho e biswha loye – Songs of Nazrul on Electric Guitar (1991) SPHOS 23129
 Tumi Rabe Nirobe – Tunes of Tagore songs on Electric Guitar (1981) SPHOS 842697
 Surer akashe tumi je go suktara (Tribute to Hemanta Mukhopadhyay) (1991) SPHOS 23137
 Surer Jharna – Bengali instrumentals on Electric Guitar (1992) SPHOS 23156

 Cassettes from Sagarika Acoustronics

 Ei sundar swarnali sandhyay – Bengali film songs on Guitar (1996) 31071
 Bhara thak smriti sudhai – Tagore songs on electric Guitar (1996) 31072

 Cassettes from Concord Records

 RENAISSANCE – Sunil Ganguly plays melodies of Kazi Nazrul Islam on Electric Guitar (1984) CB 02 03
 FIREWORKS – Instrumental Film Hits (1986) 04004

 CDs from HMV (Saregama Ltd) include
 Nostalgia Melodies to caress your Heart 'N' Soul (2001) – CDF 130310
 Nostalgia Melodies to caress your Heart 'N' Soul Ghazal Chhedi Usne, Great Ghazals on Guitar(2001) – CDF 130311

 CDs from Sagarika Acoustronics 
 Golden Greats of Yesteryears (1996) – C600015
 Yaadein (A tribute to Mohd. Rafi and Kishore Kumar) (1993) – MILS 012

Digital albums
 Melodies Forever -
 Instrumental - Kazi Anirudha and Sunil Ganguly
 Puja 93 - Sunil Ganguly
 Sentimental Journey 
 Surer Akashe Tumi Je Go Suktara 
 The Classic Touch 
 All Time Greats - Sunil Ganguly 
 Tumi Rabe Nirabe 
 Sunil Ganguly Nazrul Tunes

Notes

Indian guitarists
1999 deaths
1938 births
20th-century Indian musicians
20th-century guitarists
Musicians  from West Bengal